Greensburg is an American television series broadcast on the Planet Green television network. The show takes place in Greensburg, Kansas, and is about rebuilding that town in a sustainable way after being hit by a May, 2007 EF5 tornado.

Episodes

Season 1 (2008)

Season 2 (2009)

Season 3 (2010)

References

External links 
 Greensburg home on Discovery.com
 

Destination America original programming
2000s American reality television series
2010s American reality television series
2008 American television series debuts
2010 American television series endings
Kiowa County, Kansas
Television shows set in Kansas